Alexander Allerson is a German film and television actor.

Partial filmography
 Man and Beast (1963), as SS-Man Goldap
 Encounter in Salzburg (1964), as Mahlke
 The Upper Hand (1966)
 The Trap Snaps Shut at Midnight (1966), as Husky
 The Alley Cats (1966)
 I Deal in Danger (1966), as Draus
 Vengeance (1968)
 Assignment K (1968)
 Battle of Britain (1969), as Major Brandt
 The McKenzie Break (1970), as Lieutenant Wolff
 Slaughterhouse-Five (1972)
 Tears of Blood (1972)
 Temptation in the Summer Wind (1972)
 ... All the Way, Boys! (1973), as Saluds brother
 Ludwig (1973), as Secretary of State
 My Name Is Nobody (1973), as Rex
 Who? (1974), as Dr. Korthu
 The Odessa File (1974), as Dr. Ratinger
 The Secret Carrier (1975)
 I Only Want You to Love Me (1976), as Peter’s father
 Satan's Brew (1976), as Publisher
 Chinese Roulette (1976), as Gerhard Christ
 Shadow of Angels (1976), as Hans von Gluck
 Despair (1978), as Mayer
 Lili Marleen (1981), as Goedecke

References

Bibliography
 Wallace Steadman Watson. Understanding Rainer Werner Fassbinder: Film as Private and Public Art. Univ of South Carolina Press, 1996.

External links
 

1930 births
Living people
German male film actors
German male television actors
People from Ostróda
People from East Prussia
20th-century German male actors